Robert Hutton (born Robert Bruce Winne; June 11, 1920 – August 7, 1994) was an American actor.

Early life 
Robert Bruce Winne was born in Kingston, New York, and grew up in Ulster County, New York. He was the son of a hardware merchant and was a cousin of the Woolworth heiress Barbara Hutton. 

He attended Blair Academy, a small boarding school in Blairstown, New Jersey.

Career 
Before he ventured into films, Hutton acted at the Woodstock Playhouse in Woodstock, New York, for two seasons. His film debut as Robert Hutton came in Destination Tokyo (1943).

Hutton resembled actor Jimmy Stewart: during World War II, when Stewart enlisted in the Army Air Forces in March 1941, Hutton benefited from "victory casting" in roles that would ordinarily have gone to Stewart. His final film was The New Roof (1975).

After leaving Warner Brothers’ studios Hutton continued working in movies, TV shows and as a writer and director in England for several years. He returned years later to the United States and lived in New York where he was born and raised.

Personal life 
Hutton had a daughter and a son. He spent his last days in a nursing care facility after breaking his back in a home accident. He is interred in Calvary Cemetery in Queens, New York.

Selected filmography

 Northern Pursuit (1943) as Internment Camp Guard (uncredited)
 Destination Tokyo (1943) as Tommy Adams 
 Janie (1944) as Pfc. Dick Lawrence
 Hollywood Canteen (1944) as Cpl. Slim Green
 Roughly Speaking (1945) as John Crane, ages 20–28
 Too Young to Know (1945) as Ira Enright
 One More Tomorrow (1946) as Surprise Party Guest at Window (uncredited)
 Janie Gets Married (1946) as Dick Lawrence
 Time Out of Mind (1947) as Christopher Fortune
 Love and Learn (1947) as Bob Grant
 Always Together (1947) as Donn Masters
 Wallflower (1948) – Warren James
 Smart Girls Don't Talk (1948) as 'Doc' Vickers
 The Younger Brothers (1949) as Johnny 
 And Baby Makes Three (1949) as Herbert T. 'Herbie' Fletcher
 Beauty on Parade (1950) as Gil McRoberts
 The Steel Helmet (1951) as Pvt. Bronte
 New Mexico (1951) as Lieutenant Vermont
 Slaughter Trail (1951) as Lt. Morgan
 The Racket (1951) as Dave Ames
 Gobs and Gals (1952) as Lt. Steven F. Smith
 Tropical Heat Wave (1952) as Stafford E. Carver
 Paris Model (1953) as Charlie Johnson
 Casanova's Big Night (1954) as Raphael, Duc of Castebello
 The Big Bluff (1955) as Dr. Peter Kirk
 Scandal Incorporated (1956) as Brad Cameron
 Yaqui Drums (1956) as Lute Quigg
 The Man Without a Body (1957) as Dr. Phil R. Merritt
 Man from Tangier (1957) as Chuck Collins
 Outcasts of the City (1958)
 Showdown at Boot Hill (1958) as Sloane
 The Colossus of New York (1958) as Dr. John Robert Carrington
 Invisible Invaders (1959) as Dr. John Lamont
 It Started with a Kiss (1959) as Alwin Ashley (uncredited)
 The Jailbreakers (1960) as Tom
 Cinderfella (1960) as Rupert
 Naked Youth (1961) as Maddo
 The Slime People (1963) as Tom Gregory
 The Silicians (1963) as Calvin Adams
 The Secret Door (1964) as Joe Adams
 Búsqueme a esa chica (1964) as Mr. John Morrison
 Doctor in Clover (1966) as Rock Stewart
 Finders Keepers (1966) as Commander
 The Vulture (1966) as Dr. Eric Lutens
 They Came From Beyond Space (1967) as Dr. Curtis Temple
 You Only Live Twice (1967) as President's Aide (uncredited)
 Torture Garden (1967) as Bruce Benton (segment 2 "Terror Over Hollywood") 
 Can Hieronymus Merkin Ever Forget Mercy Humppe and Find True Happiness? (1969) as Insurance Agent (uncredited)
 Cry of the Banshee (1970) as Party Guest
 Trog (1970) as Dr. Richard Warren
 The Persuaders! (1972) as Frank Rocco
 Tales from the Crypt (1972) as Neighbour – Mr. Baker (segment 3 "Poetic Justice")
 The Cherry Picker (1974) as James Burn II
 QB VII (1974) as Ambassador Richards
 The New Roof (1975) as Alexander Hamilton (final film role)

References

External links 

 
 
 Summary

1920 births
1994 deaths
20th-century American male actors
Accidental deaths in New York (state)
American male film actors
Deaths from pneumonia in New York (state)
Male actors from New York (state)
People from Kingston, New York